Cast a Dark Shadow is a 1955 black-and-white British suspense film noir directed by Lewis Gilbert, based on the play Murder Mistaken by Janet Green. The story concerns a husband played by Dirk Bogarde who murders his wife.

Plot
After a year of marriage, Edward "Teddy" Bare kills his wealthy older wife, Monica, after she asks her lawyer, Phillip Mortimer, to change her will. He stages it to look as if she was accidentally asphyxiated while drunkenly trying to light the gas fire.

To his chagrin, he discovers that she actually intended to leave him all her money; instead, he only inherits the mansion from a prior will, while her fortune is left in trust to her only relative, her sister Dora. She leaves £200 to the elderly maid, but Edward convinces the maid that this was in lieu of wages, getting her to then work for free. Edward will receive the main inheritance only if Dora dies. An inquest rules it an accident, but Phillip, Monica's lawyer, makes it clear that he suspects Edward. When Edward asks where Dora lives, Phillip tells him she is far away, in Jamaica.

Edward meets Freda, a merry widow, in a seaside hotel and woos her. He invites her to stay at the huge house which he has inherited. She becomes friendly with the maid.

Edward manages to marry lower-class but well-off widow Freda Jeffries, who is closer to Edward's age than Monica, but much less trusting than her predecessor, keeping tight control over her fortune. As the death of a second spouse so soon after the first would be highly suspicious, he is powerless to do anything. The new couple meet Charlotte Young, whose car has broken down. Charlotte is looking for a house to purchase for an equestrian school. As Edward was an estate agent before he married Monica, he shows her several properties, making Freda jealous. He tells Charlotte this.

Edward lures Charlotte to his mansion late one night while Freda and the servant are out. He reveals he knows that Charlotte is actually Dora. Then he brazenly admits killing her sister before trying to make her leave. Suspicious, she remains where she is. However, Freda and Emily return home unexpectedly, as Emily felt unwell, and Freda escorts Charlotte to the door. After Charlotte drives away, Edward tells Freda that he killed Monica, secure in the knowledge that a wife cannot be compelled to testify against her husband, and that he expects to inherit Charlotte's money shortly, as he has tampered with the brakes on her car. He is shocked when Phillip enters the room, having heard his confession, followed by his intended victim. She had returned to the house after meeting the lawyer at the estate's gate. Edward flees in his car, but the entrance is blocked by Charlotte's and Phillip's automobiles. With Phillip in pursuit, Edward switches to another vehicle, only to realise too late that he has taken Charlotte's. He loses control and drives off a cliff.

Cast
 Dirk Bogarde as Edward "Teddy" Bare 
 Margaret Lockwood as Freda Jeffries 
 Kay Walsh as Charlotte Young
 Kathleen Harrison as Emily (Emmie), the Bares' maid
 Robert Flemyng as Phillip Mortimer 
 Mona Washbourne as Monica (Milly) Bare
 Philip Stainton as Charlie Mann, a business associate of Edward's 
 Walter Hudd as Coroner 
 Lita Roza as Singer. This is Roza's film debut.

Production
The film was based on the play Murder Mistaken by Janet Green. Green wanted Dirk Bogarde to be in the play but he turned it down and Derek Farr played the role instead. When Lewis Gilbert was making The Sea Shall Not Have Them he saw the play and thought it would make a good film, and he persuaded Bogarde to play the lead.

Bogarde persuaded Margaret Lockwood to co star. "I was dubious about being able to play such a character, though I liked her honesty," said Lockwood.

"I think it was a very interesting plot, very claustrophobic," said Gilbert. "I think it was the best thing Margaret Lockwood did, she was great in the film."

Dirk Bogarde later said "the unwholesomeness of the hero was what was fun about it."

Reception
Bosley Crowther of The New York Times wrote that the actors are skilled but "they are not offered many opportunities to make Cast a Dark Shadow mysterious or tense."

In September 1956, Maclean's film reviewer, Clyde Gilmour described the film as "[a] solid little murder thriller from Britain."

Lewis Gilbert later said "it was reasonably successful but by then Margaret [Lockwood] had been in several really bad films and her name on a picture was rather counter-productive." According to Kinematograph Weekly it was a "money maker" at the British box office in 1955.

Dirk Bogarde said "the film was a failure":
<blockquote>It was the first time I had come under another star's name - Margaret Lockwood - and it just died, which was a pity because it was a very good movie and I had persuaded Maggie to do it. I remember being on tour in Cardiff with a play and I saw a poster for Cast a Dark Shadow and it had 'Dirk Bogarde in Cast a Dark Shadow''' and, at the very bottom, 'with Margaret Lockwood'. They altered the billing order because they saw it was dying and that, astoundingly, her name had killed it, though it was probably her best performance ever.</blockquote>
"I'm glad I did it, but am still wondering exactly where it got me," said Lockwood in 1973. After making the movie she did not appear in a feature film for another 21 years.Halliwell's Film & Video Guide described the film as "[unambitious] but enjoyable melodrama, well acted though with directorial opportunities missed."

Home mediaCast a Dark Shadow was given a DVD commercial release by Simply Media in June 2015 - nearly 60 years after its theatrical release.

References

External links
 
 
Cast a Dark Shadow at Britmovie
 
 
 Cast a Dark Shadow at BFI
 Cast a Dark Shadow at Rotten Tomatoes
Review of film at Variety''

1955 films
1955 crime films
1950s crime thriller films
British black-and-white films
British crime thriller films
British films based on plays
Film noir
Films directed by Lewis Gilbert
Films produced by Herbert Mason
Films scored by Antony Hopkins
Films set in Brighton
Films set in country houses
Films shot in East Sussex
Films shot in Hertfordshire
Uxoricide in fiction
1950s English-language films
1950s British films